Abraham Calderón (born November 25, 1988) is a Mexican racecar driver from Monterrey.  He currently drives the No. 2 ARRIS Toyota in the NASCAR Mexico Series. In 2014 he won the Toyota Series championship; previously he had already won the 2006 NASCAR Mexico T4 Series championship.

Motorsports career results

NASCAR
(key) (Bold – Pole position awarded by qualifying time. Italics – Pole position earned by points standings or practice time. * – Most laps led.)

K&N Pro Series East

PEAK Mexico Series

 Season still in progress
 Ineligible for series points

References

External links
 

Living people
Racing drivers from Nuevo León
Sportspeople from Monterrey
NASCAR drivers
1988 births